British Vietnamese International School in Ho Chi Minh City, commonly referred to as BVIS HCMC, is a bilingual international school in Vietnam, and the only bilingual school in Vietnam that is fully accredited by the Council of International Schools (CIS). The school is also a member of the FOBISIA group of schools, and is part of the Nord Anglia Education Group.

BVIS educates children at preschool, primary and secondary level. The school uses the English National Curriculum with modules from the Vietnamese curriculum that are believed to be particularly strong: Vietnamese Literature, History and Geography.

History
BVIS was officially established in August 2011 after the success of its sister school the British International School which was established in 1997.

School Facilities 
BVIS HCMC is a purpose-built school. It has an "early years" soft play area, 2 swimming pools, a library with 56,400 books, a modern lecture theatre, a number of dance, music and drama studios, an auditorium, a sports hall and a grass playing field, amongst other facilities. All classrooms are equipped with interactive whiteboards and data projectors.

See also
 British International School, Ho Chi Minh City
 British Vietnamese International School, Hanoi
 International school

References

Ho Chi Minh City
United Kingdom–Vietnam relations
International schools in Ho Chi Minh City
Cambridge schools in Vietnam